Castellina Scalo is a town in Tuscany, central Italy, administratively a frazione of the comune of Monteriggioni, province of Siena. At the time of the 2001 census its population was 1,809.

Castellina Scalo is about 20 km from Siena and 4 km from Monteriggioni.

References 

Frazioni of Monteriggioni
Railway towns in Italy